Coventry City Derby Dolls (CCDD) are Coventry's first and only all female flat track roller derby league based in Coventry, United Kingdom.

League History 
The idea for the league began in March 2011 amongst a small group of friends—none of whom had previous roller derby experience and who like many newcomers to the sport, had discovered roller derby after its popularisation from the 2009 film Whip It (film).

The group began by learning basic skating skills in a small fitness studio in Coventry's AT7 Centre. On 16 August 2011, the group (now 8–10 regular skaters) had their first official outing at the Goodwood Roller Marathon, under the name Coventry City Derby Dolls. Soon after, CCDD outgrew their original practice venue and began regular training sessions at Coventry Sports and Leisure Centre.

Since 2011, Coventry City Derby Dolls have held several open intakes and, as of April 2013, have a membership of around 50 skaters.

League Structure 
CCDD are a skater-run organisation. A committee of elected officers manages the league. These officers head up sub-committees in areas such as: Coaching, Referee Training, Head NSO, Merchandise Officer, Events Organisers, Social Media Officer, League Liaison, etc.

Coaching 
CCDD have two dedicated Coaches: Head Coach and Club President Jon Scott (AKA Scott Jon DaRocks), and Newbie/Rookie Coach Paul Husiw-Aiken (AKA Hucifer), as well as a team of CCDD Referees who are trained under Head Referee Andy 'Psychotic' Hill. In addition to their in-house coaching team, CCDD have received valuable input and guest coach appearances from fellow Midlands roller derby teams: Crash Test Brummies, Central City Rollergirls and Birmingham Blitz Dames.

Bouts Played 
CCDD made their public bouting debut 25/08/2013. It came from outer bounds was held at Coventry sports and leisure centre (Cov baths) against Oxford Wheels of Glory. Half time was called with a score of CCDD, 123 - OWG, 42. OWG made a good comeback in the second half bringing the bout to a nail biting conclusion of CCDD, 179 - OWG, 184. Coventry City Derby Dolls raised a total of £273 with sales of cake and raffle tickets during the bout for the local charity Coventry Haven.

CCDD Mission Statement 
"Our aim is to promote and foster the sport of Women's Flat Track Roller Derby within Coventry and the West Midlands. We are strong, diverse and competitive women, who practice good sportsmanship. We aim to instil a sense of loyalty, passion and sisterhood among our skaters, and build a sense of family amongst our organisation as a whole. We believe that with hard work, we can achieve anything!"

Events and Appearances
Some of CCDD appeared at an interactive roller derby demo in Broadgate, Coventry, on 30 March 2013, where they were invited to participate in a game of human pinball as part of Coventry University’s Design Degree Show 2013. This event marked the first time roller derby had been seen in the city, drawing much interest from within the local community. 
As part of a grassroots fundraising drive, CCDD hosted a movie night at Taylor John’s House, Coventry, on 24 February 2013. Tickets were advertised via friends and social media in an effort to bring roller derby to a wider audience. The movie night featured the documentary ‘This is Roller Derby’, along with a bake sale.

CCDD members provided a talk at ‘Revolt’, a club night at Taylor John's House, Coventry. During the talk, they promoted the league and sport as a whole, and even managed to recruit more members from the interest this generated.

References 

Roller derby in England
Sport in Coventry
Women in the United Kingdom